Sha'arei Hesed (also Sha'arei Chessed) (lit. Gates of Loving-kindness) is a neighborhood in central Jerusalem, bordering Rehavia, Nahlaot and Kiryat Wolfson.

History

One of the founders of the neighborhood was Yoel Moshe Salomon, who also founded Nahalat Shiv'a. The cornerstone was laid by the Ashkenazi chief rabbi of Jerusalem,  Rabbi Shmuel Salant, in 1909. Rabbi Salant and Rabbi Naftali Porush established a building fund with donations from abroad to build small apartments for religious Jews in Jerusalem. The first 114 houses were built on long, narrow plots of land with a small yard in front or back.

Today
In recent years, Sha'arei Hesed has become a modern Haredi neighborhood, as old-time Jerusalemites move out. The area is undergoing gentrification, and many homes have been purchased by affluent Orthodox Jewish families from abroad, especially from English-speaking countries. The neighborhood has several yeshivas, among them Maalos Hatorah, Midrash Shmuel and Noam HaTalmud, along with a large number of synagogues.

Notable residents
 Yaakov Moshe Charlap, rabbi of Sha'arei Hesed and Rosh Yeshiva of the Mercaz HaRav yeshiva
 Shlomo Zalman Auerbach
 Shmuel Auerbach
 Sholom Schwadron
 Dov Berish Weidenfeld (Tchebiner Rav)
 Avraham David Rosenthal
 Mordechai Leib Kaminetzky

References

Neighbourhoods of Jerusalem